The frequency of Y haplogroups in percent among Kazakh tribes.

Haplogroups of the tribes of the Senior zhuz
Senior Zhuz is formed by a combination of not only genetically related tribal groups, but also genetically remote.

Y haplogroups of the tribes of the Senior zhuz in percentage.

Western/European Kazakhs 
A study analyzing the haplogroups of Western Kazakhs, in the European part of Kazakhstan, found that the majority (2/3) of Kazakh samples belong to the paternal haplogroup C2a1a2-M48, which, according to the authors, supports the traditional genealogy claims that the Alimuly and Baiuly clans descent from Emir Alau (and his paternal relatives).

References 

History of Kazakhstan
Kazakhs
Ethnic Kazakh people
Tribes of Asia
Kazakh tribes